Novinki is a rural locality (a village) in Ivanovskoye Rural Settlement, Kovrovsky District, Vladimir Oblast, Russia. The population was 15 as of 2010. There is 1 street.

Geography 
Novinki is located 34 km southeast of Kovrov (the district's administrative centre) by road. Shilovskoye is the nearest rural locality.

References 

Rural localities in Kovrovsky District